Harold Ormandy Fielding (13 November 1912 – 30 August 1987) was an Anglican priest who served as Archdeacon of Rochdale from 1972 to 1982.

Born in 1912, the son of Harold W. Fielding and Florence Fielding (née Ormandy), he was educated at Farnworth Grammar School and Magdalene College, Cambridge, and then trained for the Anglican ministry at Ripon College Cuddesdon. Fielding married to  Elsie Whillance at St James' Church, Farnworth in 1939. They had four children: Timothy, Robert, Catherine, and John. After curacies at St Mary's, Leigh and St Paul's, Walkden, he was Vicar of St James', New Bury from  1944 to 1965. Fielding was then Vicar of St Peter's, Bolton from 1965 to 1982, during which time he also became Archdeacon of Rochdale. After his retirement, he lived in Bromley Cross, a suburb in the Metropolitan Borough of Bolton. He published a book in 1983 about James Slade, Vicar of St Peter's, Bolton, one of Fielding's 19th-century predecessors. He died on 30 August 1987, aged 74.

References

1912 births
People educated at Farnworth Grammar School
Alumni of Magdalene College, Cambridge
Alumni of Ripon College Cuddesdon
Archdeacons of Rochdale
1987 deaths